Paul Herbert Hodge (March 24, 1910 – December 26, 1976) was an American bridge player.

Hodge was originally from Meers, Oklahoma and grew up in Norman. He attended the University of Oklahoma, earning a bachelor's degree and then a law degree. After 10 years working as an attorney in Oklahoma, he moved to Abilene, Texas, where he lived for 21 years. He worked as an attorney until 1967, when he moved to Houston and set up a bridge club. He died in a hospital in Houston after a four-month illness.  Hodge was inducted into the ACBL Hall of Fame in 2010.

Bridge accomplishments

Honors

 ACBL Hall of Fame, 2010

Awards

 Fishbein Trophy (1) 1955
 Herman Trophy (2) 1954, 1956

Wins

 North American Bridge Championships (9)
 von Zedtwitz Life Master Pairs (1) 1955 
 Rockwell Mixed Pairs (1) 1953 
 Open Pairs (1928-1962) (2) 1954, 1956 
 Marcus Cup (1) 1955 
 Mitchell Board-a-Match Teams (2) 1953, 1956 
 Reisinger (2) 1955, 1964

Runners-up

 Bermuda Bowl (1) 1961
 North American Bridge Championships
 Wernher Open Pairs (2) 1957, 1960 
 Vanderbilt (1) 1959 
 Mitchell Board-a-Match Teams (1) 1960 
 Reisinger (3) 1956, 1957, 1959 
 Spingold (1) 1967

References

External links
 
 

1910 births
1976 deaths
American contract bridge players
Bermuda Bowl players
People from Norman, Oklahoma
University of Oklahoma alumni
20th-century American lawyers
People from Abilene, Texas